Livai Nalagilagi is a former Fijian rugby league footballer who represented Fiji at the 1995 World Cup.

Playing career
Nalagilagi played for Fiji in the 1992 World Sevens. He played for the Penrith Panthers in the 1994 NSWRL Premiership. Between 1994 and 1996 he played five test matches for Fiji.

References

Living people
Fiji national rugby league team captains
Fiji national rugby league team players
Fijian rugby league players
I-Taukei Fijian people
Penrith Panthers players
Place of birth missing (living people)
Rugby league centres
Year of birth missing (living people)